NMKY Helsinki (HNMKY for short) is a YMCA in Helsinki, Finland, best known for its basketball section. Other activities include sports like floorball and martial arts, scouting, choirs, orchestras and various youth clubs.

Basketball 
The basketball section of NMKY Helsinki was founded in 1927 as the first basketball club in Finland. Due to financial difficulties, both men and women's first squads were dissolved in 2009. HNMKY currently plays in the Finnish third tier II divisioona with their Under-23 squad.

Honours 
Finnish Championship (7): 1946, 1947, 1984, 1985,1987, 1989, 1992

Sources 
Basketball in English NMKY Helsinki Official Homepage

External links 
NMKY Helsinki at Eurobasket
HNMKY Helsinki at Basket.fi (in Finnish)

Sports clubs established in 1888
Basketball teams established in 1927
Basketball teams in Finland
Sports clubs in Helsinki
Sports clubs founded by the YMCA